A helicopter is susceptible to a rolling tendency,
called dynamic rollover, when close to the ground,
especially when taking off or landing.
For dynamic rollover to occur, some factor has to first
cause the helicopter to roll or pivot around a skid, or
landing gear wheel, until its critical rollover angle is
reached. Then, beyond this point, main rotor thrust continues
the roll and recovery is impossible. If the critical
rollover angle is exceeded, the helicopter rolls on its
side regardless of the cyclic control corrections made.

Dynamic rollover begins when the helicopter starts to
pivot around its skid or wheel. This can occur for a
variety of reasons, including the failure to remove a
tiedown or skid securing device, or if the skid or wheel
contacts a fixed object while hovering sideward, or if
the gear is stuck in ice, soft asphalt, or mud. Dynamic
rollover may also occur if the pilot does not use the proper
landing or takeoff technique or while performing slope
operations. Whatever the cause, if the gear or skid
becomes a pivot point, dynamic rollover is possible if
the pilot does not use the proper corrective technique.

Once started, dynamic rollover cannot be stopped by
application of opposite cyclic control alone. For example, if
the right skid contacts an object and becomes the
pivot point while the helicopter starts rolling to the
right, even with full left cyclic applied the main rotor
thrust vector and its moment follows the aircraft as it
continues rolling to the right. Quickly applying down
collective is the most effective way to stop dynamic
rollover from developing. Dynamic rollover can occur
in both skid and wheel equipped helicopters, and all
types of rotor systems.

Static rollover 
Static Rollover is a rolling action when the helicopter blades are not in rotation. When the rotor blades stop, the helicopter has the same principles of any other object and will roll if the static rollover critical angle is exceeded. Each helicopter has its own critical angle; this is a byproduct of its center-of-gravity. 

A rolling object has a pivot point and an imaginary line extending upward from the pivot point; as the object rolls around the pivot point, the center of gravity moves closer to the pivot line. Only upon passing the pivot line will the object roll to the corresponding adjacent side of the base.

The static rollover critical angle can be determined by measuring the angle between level ground and an imaginary line drawn from skid to skid, when the helicopter's center of gravity is located on the upward pivot line.

Static rollover also pertains to automobiles.  In the study of roll stability of vehicles, the static rollover threshold is a key measure.  It is expressed as a lateral acceleration in gravitational units.  In reality, rollovers are dynamic events; however, there is a strong relationship between roll stability and occurrences of rollover in accidents.

See also

References

Notes

Sources
 Flight Standards Service. Rotorcraft Flying Handbook: FAA Manual H-8083-21. Washington, DC: Flight Standards Service, Federal Aviation Administration, U.S. Dept. of Transportation, 2001. .

External links 
Helicopter Pilot Loses Control
Dynamic Rollover at Helicopter Flight Information
Helicopter Dynamic Rollover
Dynamic Rollover - Knowledge magazine (US Army)
Preventing Dynamic Rollover - Flight Safety Foundation

Helicopters
Aviation risks
Automotive safety